Jacob Doyle (born July 25, 1989) is an American professional wrestler. He is best known for his time in Impact Wrestling, where he performed under the ring name Jake Something.

Professional wrestling career

Independent circuit (2010–present) 
Doyle was trained by ROH Dojo. He made his professional wrestling debut at an Insanity Pro Wrestling (IPW) event on January 2, 2010, losing to Chris Hall. He has worked for many independent promotions such as Ring of Honor (ROH), National Wrestling Alliance (NWA), AAW Wrestling (AAW), and Border City Wrestling (BCW).

Impact Wrestling

Early appearances (2017)
He first appeared on the March 23, 2017 episode of Impact! under the ring name Jake Holmes, where he lost to Bobby Lashley. He had two more matches for Impact Wrestling as an enhancement talent the following month.

The Deaners (2018–2020)
On March 9, 2018, at the Last Chancery event that featured Impact Wrestling and Border City Wrestling wrestlers, Doyle, now known as Jake Deaner, formed a tag team with Cody Deaner called The Deaners, losing to Desi Hit Squad (Gursinder Singh and Rohit Raju). In April 2019, he officially signed a contract with Impact Wrestling. Later that month, vignettes began airing of The Deaners on their farm called The Deaner Compound. The Deaners made their Impact! debut on the April 26 episode, defeating Idris Abraham and Joe Coleman. The following month, his ring name was changed to Cousin Jake. At Bound for Glory, Jake took part in the Call Your Shot Gauntlet match, where the winner could choose any championship match of their choice, which was won by Eddie Edwards. On the May 26, 2020 episode of Impact!, The Deaners failed to win the Impact World Tag Team Championship from The North (Ethan Page and Josh Alexander) at The Deaner Compound. On the Countdown to Bound for Glory, The Deaners defeated The Rascalz (Dez and Wentz).

At Turning Point, Jake and Cody were attacked by Eric Young and Joe Doering. During the following weeks, The Deaners feuded with Young and Doering and this resulted in a match between Cody and Young on the December 8 episode of Impact!, which Young won. At Final Resolution, Cody attacked Jake during a match between Rhino and Young, thus ending The Deaners tag team.

Singles competition (2020–2022)
Jake then began a feud with Violent By Design, a stable that Cody, now known as Deaner, joined. At Hard To Kill on January 16, 2021, Jake teamed with Rhino and Tommy Dreamer in a loss to Violent By Design in an Old School Rules match. Cousin Jake would change his ring name to Jake Something and defeated Deaner in a singles match at No Surrender and in a tables match on the February 23 episode of Impact!.

On the August 5 episode of Impact!, Something defeated Trey Miguel, Daivari, and Rohit Raju in a four-way match to become the number one contender to the Impact X Division Championship. At Emergence, Something received his championship match against Josh Alexander, where he was unsuccessful in capturing the title. On September 18 at Victory Road, Something competed in a five-way scramble match to determine the number one contender to the X Division Championship, which was won by Laredo Kid. On November 17, he participated in a number one contenders match to the Impact Digital Media Championship, which was won by Chelsea Green.

On January 8, 2022, Something defeated Madman Fulton on the Countdown to Hard To Kill pre-show. On the February 3 episode of Impact!, he teamed with Fulton, Ace Austin, and Mike Bailey for an eight-man tag team match against Bullet Club (Jay White, Chris Bey, Tama Tonga, and Tanga Loa) in a losing effort. At No Surrender, Something defeated Austin, Bey, and Bailey in a four-way match to become the number one contender for the X Division Championship. On March 5 at Sacrifice, Something fought against Trey Miguel for the title in a losing effort. Two days later, Something announced on his Twitter account that he is no longer with Impact Wrestling.

Championships and accomplishments 
 AAW Wrestling
 AAW Heavyweight Championship (1 time, current)
 AAW Heritage Championship (1 time)
 AAW Tag Team Championship (1 time) – with Stallion Rogers
 Border City Wrestling
 BCW Can-Am Tag Team Championship (1 time) – with Phil Atlas
 Black Label Pro
 BLP Heavyweight Championship (1 time)
 Glory Pro Wrestling
 Crown Of Glory Championship (2 times)
 Crossfire Wrestling
 CW Tag Team Championship (1 time) – with Cody Deaner
 Pro Wrestling Illustrated
 Ranked No. 149 of the top 500 singles wrestlers in the PWI 500 in 2021
 Superkick'D
 Superkick'D Championship (3 times)
 Superkick'D King Of The 6IX Championship (2 times)
 Victory Independent Pro Wrestling
 VIP Tag Team Championship (2 times) – with Donnie Hollows
 Wrestling And Respect
 WAR Championship (1 time)
 WAR Tag Team Championship (1 time) – with Donnie Hollows
 Xtreme Intense Championship Wrestling
 XICW Xtreme Intense Championship (2 times)
 XICW Light Heavyweight Championship (1 time)
 XICW Tag Team Championship (2 times) – with Donnie Hollows

References

External links 
 Jake Something's Impact Wrestling profile
 
 

1989 births
21st-century professional wrestlers
American male professional wrestlers
Living people
People from Midland, Michigan
Professional wrestlers from Michigan
AAW Heavyweight Champions
AAW Heritage Champions
AAW Tag Team Champions